The Hanged Man (XII) is the twelfth Major Arcana card in most traditional tarot decks. It is used in game playing as well as in divination.

It depicts a pittura infamante, an image of a man being hanged upside-down by one ankle (the only exception being the Tarocco Siciliano, which depicts the man hanged by the neck instead). This method of hanging was a common punishment at the time for traitors in Italy. However, the solemn expression on his face traditionally suggests that he is there by his own accord, and the card is meant to represent self-sacrifice more so than it does corporal punishment or criminality.

In other interpretations, The Hanged Man is a depiction of the Norse god Odin, who suspended himself from a tree in order to gain knowledge. There is also a Christian interpretation that portrays Judas Iscariot, and include the bags of silver in his hands. In the Lo Scarabeo African American tarot deck the 12th card of the major arcana is the Observer, depicting the Nigerian god "Ifa" of fate and destiny blindfolded and surrounded by eyes.

Description
A 1393 decree for Milan and Lombardy of the punishment for traitors: "Let him be drug [dragged] on a [wooden] plank at a horse’s tail to the place of execution, and there be suspended by one foot to the gallows, and be left there until he is dead. As long as he lives let him be given food and drink."

Modern versions of the tarot deck depict a man hanging upside-down by one foot. The figure is most often suspended from a wooden beam (as in a cross or gallows) or a tree. Ambiguity results from the fact that the card itself may be viewed inverted.

In his 1910 book The Pictorial Key to the Tarot, A. E. Waite, the designer of the Rider–Waite tarot deck, wrote of the symbol:

The gallows from which he is suspended forms a Tau cross, while the figure—from the position of the legs—forms a fylfot cross. There is a nimbus about the head of the seeming martyr. It should be noted (1) that the tree of sacrifice is living wood, with leaves thereon; (2) that the face expresses deep entrancement, not suffering; (3) that the figure, as a whole, suggests life in suspension, but life and not death. [...] It has been called falsely a card of martyrdom, a card of prudence, a card of the Great Work, a card of duty [...] I will say very simply on my own part that it expresses the relation, in one of its aspects, between the Divine and the Universe.

Waite writes that the card carries several divinatory associations:

12. THE HANGED MAN.—Wisdom, circumspection, discernment, trials, sacrifice, intuition, divination, prophecy. Reversed: Selfishness, the crowd, body politic.

There is a halo burning brightly around the hanged man's head, signifying a higher learning or an enlightenment.

In astrology, the Hanged Man card is associated with the planet Neptune and the Pisces zodiac sign.

In media
In the manga and anime series JoJo's Bizarre Adventure: Stardust Crusaders, tarot cards are used to name the characters' abilities, called 'Stands'. J. Geil has a Stand named The Hanged Man.

References

Further reading
 A. E. Waite's 1910 Pictorial Key to the Tarot
 Hajo Banzhaf (2000), Tarot and the Journey of the Hero
 Wood, Juliette (1998). "The Celtic Tarot and the Secret Tradition: A Study in Modern Legend Making". Folklore 109: 15–24
 Francesca Lia Block (1999), The Hanged Man

External links 
 

Major Arcana